The electoral district of Kelvin Grove was a Legislative Assembly electorate in the state of Queensland. It was first created in a redistribution ahead of the 1923 state election, and existed until the 1960 state election.

Kelvin Grove replaced part of the former Electoral district of Enoggera.

Kelvin Grove was abolished in 1960, replaced mainly by the Electoral district of Ashgrove.

Members for Kelvin Grove

Tooth went on to represent Ashgrove from May 1960 to December 1974.

See also
 Electoral districts of Queensland
 Members of the Queensland Legislative Assembly by year
 :Category:Members of the Queensland Legislative Assembly by name

References

Former electoral districts of Queensland
1923 establishments in Australia
1960 disestablishments in Australia
Constituencies established in 1923
Constituencies disestablished in 1960